James Ring (1856–1939) was a New Zealand photographer. He was born in Camberwell, Surrey, England in 1856.

References

1856 births
1939 deaths
New Zealand photographers
People from Camberwell
English emigrants to New Zealand